Acraga coa is a moth of the family Dalceridae. It is found in southern Mexico, Belize, Honduras, Guatemala, El Salvador, Costa Rica and Panama. The habitat consists of tropical wet, tropical moist, tropical premontane wet, tropical premontane rain, tropical lower montane moist, subtropical wet, subtropical moist, subtropical dry and warm temperate wet forests.

The forewings are yellow-orange to red-brown, with yellow veins. The hindwings are yellow-orange and paler than the forewings. Adults are on wing year-round.

The larvae feed on the leaves of Terminalia, Coffea and Citrus species.

References

Dalceridae
Moths described in 1892